The Holiday Face–Off is a mid-season college ice hockey tournament with the first iteration played in late December of 2021.

History
The Holiday Face–Off was brought about by the Gazelle Group, a marketing firm based in Princeton, New Jersey. The group sought to rekindle a mid-western holiday tournament that had previously been organized by the University of Wisconsin–Madison as the Badger Showdown. No winter tournament had been held in the region since the Showdown was discontinued in 2009.

The tournament was first supposed to be held on December 28-29, 2020. However, it was postponed to 2021 due to the COVID-19 outbreak. The original teams meant to play were the Wisconsin Badgers, Clarkson Golden Knights, UConn Huskies, and Arizona State Sun Devils.

On June 15, 2021, it was announced that the inaugural Holiday Face-Off tournament would be played on December 28-29, 2021 between the Wisconsin Badgers, Providence Friars, Bowling Green Falcons, and Yale Bulldogs. The Badgers and Friars took the championship game into overtime and ended with a final score of 2-2. The Badgers would ultimately win the inaugural Holiday Face-Off championship on a shootout goal by freshman forward, Zach Urdahl.

Yearly Results

References

External link
 

Sports competitions in Wisconsin
College sports in Wisconsin
College ice hockey tournaments in the United States
Recurring sporting events established in 2021
2021 establishments in Wisconsin
Ice hockey in Wisconsin